Labeobarbus caudovittatus is a species of cyprinid fish in the genus Labeobarbus which occurs across a wide area of central Africa from Gabon in the west to Tanzania in the east.

References 

caudovittatus
Cyprinid fish of Africa
Taxa named by George Albert Boulenger
Fish described in 1902